The  Miss Virginia USA competition is the pageant that selects the representative for the state of Virginia in the Miss USA pageant.

Virginia has been only moderately successful in terms of number of semi-finalists. They have had two Miss USAs. They are one of only four states to have had two Miss USAs in succession (the others being Illinois, Texas, and District of Columbia). Virginia's greatest success came from the late 1960s to early 1980s. Virginia should have had the first Miss USA crown in 1954, as Ellen Whitehead finished 1st runner-up, and Miss USA 1954, Miriam Stevenson, became Miss Universe 1954. However, there was no rule until the 1960s that the 1st runner-up became Miss USA after the winner won Miss Universe. If that was true, 2nd runner-up, Miss New York USA, Karin Hultman would have become Miss USA 1954, as Whitehead was disqualified due to being underage.

Ten Miss Virginia USA winners have previously held the Miss Virginia Teen USA title and competed at Miss Teen USA and three were previously competed in other states (Georgia, New Jersey and New York), at thirteen. Virginia also currently holds the record for the most Miss Teen USA state winners to win a Miss USA state title from the same state. Two Miss winners have also competed at Miss America.

The current titleholder is Kailee Horvath of Ashburn was crowned on April 16, 2022, at Hylton Performing Arts Center in Manassas. She represented Virginia for the title of Miss USA 2022.

Gallery of titleholders

Results summary
Miss USAs: Wendy Dascomb (1969), Deborah Shelton (1970)
1st runners-up: Ellen Whitehead (1954), Patricia Southall (1994)
2nd runners-up: Samantha Casey (2010)
4th runners-up: Sheryl Lynn Herring (1977)
Top 10: Meredith Blankenship (1998),  Kellie Lightbourn (1999), Lauren Barnette (2007), Desiree Williams  (2016)
Top 11/12: Brenda Joyce Miller (1971), Linda McKee (1975), Robin Shadle (1978), Betsy Bott (1979), Pam Hutchens (1981),Sondra Dee Jones (1982), Marsha Ralls (1987), Brandi Bottorff (1992), 
Top 15/16/20: Elizabeth "Betty" Karen Kallmyer (1967), Laurie Burke (1968), Maegan Phillips (2009), Arielle Rosmarino (2014), Laura Puleo (2015), Christina Thompson (2021)

Virginia holds a record of 24 placements at Miss USA.

Awards
Miss Congeniality: Kimberly Nicewonder (1989)
Miss Photogenic: Elizabeth "Betty" Karen Kallmyer (1967), Deborah Shelton (1970), Brenda Joyce Miller (1971), Sondra Dee Jones (1982), Patricia Southall (1994), Audra Wilks (1997)
 Best in Swimsuit: Patricia Southall (1994)

Winners 

Color key

References

External links
Official Website

Virginia
Virginia culture
Women in Virginia
Recurring events established in 1952
1952 establishments in Virginia
Annual events in Virginia